The following are lists of screenwriters:

 List of Albanian screenwriters
 List of Nigerian screenwriters